State Route 164 (SR-164) is a state highway in the U.S. state of Utah. Spanning  , it connects State Route 198 (Main Street) with Interstate 15 south of Spanish Fork in Utah County.

Route description
State Route 164 begins at exit 253 of Interstate 15 just south of Spanish Fork. The route travels east along 8000 South for about  before becoming Arrowhead Trail road and turning to the northeast for another  and ending at SR-198.

History
In 1962, the Utah State Legislature designated State Route 164 (along with State Route 75 and State Route 156 as a state highway in order to "provide adequate connections to Interstate Route 15 between Provo and Springville, and also in the vicinity of Spanish Fork". The route has remained unchanged since then, save for minor rewording in the description to accommodate the renumbering of SR-198 at its eastern terminus.

Major intersections

References

164
 164
Spanish Fork, Utah